"September Sun" is a single by gothic metal band Type O Negative from the 2007 album Dead Again. The nearly ten minute song was edited to just 4½ minutes for the single release. The single was released on January 14, 2008, ten months after the album's release on March 13, 2007. "September Sun" was the band's final single released before the passing of frontman Peter Steele.

Writing and inspiration 
Peter Steele dreamt about what would happen if he was haunted in bright sunshine, so he proposed the song titled "September Sun." He began writing this song featuring melancholy lyrics about the dead, doom, and sadness, beginning the first line of lyrics with the song title. The song and the lyrics give inspiration about being depressed without being dark, which gives way to hope and reminisce, like experiencing the first sunset after sorrow or bereavement.

Composition and peripherals 
Josh Silver plays the piano to begin the song while Peter Steele sings. The piano section sounds similar to songs featured on another Type O Negative album October Rust, hence the third line of lyrics beginning with the words 'October's Rust.' Kenny Hickey sings the heavier part while he plays the guitar. After that, the song repeats the first two parts again, but with different lyrics during the piano part. Then the song goes to the next section featuring slow, powerful and repeated riffs, sung by Steele. Then during the last quarter of this song, it plays a military-like symphonic tune of emotional riffs that gives an extremely airy feeling to listeners. Hickey sings the last section. On the album version, the final section has an airy ending, followed by a constant line of repeated notes from a synthesizer while alternating between high and low notes in the downward trend, signifying the end of the song with a backmasked message by Steele. The message is from a voicemail left on a friend's answering machine in 1998. However, on the single version, the symphonic section simply fades to end it.

Video
A video was released for the radio version of the song. It was shot in October 2007 and was directed by Ivan and Josip Colic. The video tells a story of an unhappy couple interchanged with shots of Type O Negative performing the song on a roof. A woman leaves her man, he remains still haunted by their bygone love and eventually attempts suicide by jumping off the roof, but is stopped at the last moment.

Personnel 
Peter Steele - lead vocals, bass guitar
Kenny Hickey - backing vocals, electric guitar
Josh Silver - backing vocals, keyboards, sound effects
Johnny Kelly - drums, percussion

References

External links 
 Type O Negative - "September Sun" SPV Records on YouTube
 Type O Negative - September Sun (album version) on YouTube

Heavy metal ballads
Type O Negative songs
2008 singles
Songs written by Peter Steele
2007 songs